Bashar Murad (Arabic: بشار مراد; born 7 February 1993) is a Palestinian singer-songwriter and video artist based in East Jerusalem. His music addresses societal norms, the Israeli occupation, and gender equality in the Middle East. He is most commonly known for his collaboration with Icelandic techno-punk band Hatari on the song "Klefi / Samed (صامد)", which was shortly released after Hatari raised banners featuring the Palestinian flag at the final of Eurovision Song Contest 2019 in Tel Aviv, Israel. Murad released his debut EP "Maskhara" in June 2021.

Early life 
Murad was born in East Jerusalem in 1993. His mother's name is Fadia Daibes and his father is Said Murad, the founder of the Palestinian musical group, Sabreen, the first alternative Palestinian musical group. The band was founded in 1980 and Murad was born during the height of their career. This is one reason why for him, music was always part of his identity and a means to escape from reality. Music helped him to overcome the pressure from growing up in an occupied territory and growing up homosexual in a conservative society. 

Upon graduating from the Jerusalem American School, he pursued his Bachelor's degree at Bridgewater College, VA. In the US, he realized that not a lot of his co-students knew much about Palestine, yet they wanted to know more about it. This made him realise that he did not want to escape politics and started covering these issues in his music. Since his return to East Jerusalem in 2014 and after he published several singles in Arabic and English on his YouTube Channel, he built an online audience.

Career 
Murad started his career by uploading cover versions of popular songs on his YouTube channel which he created in 2009. Later, he added a Middle Eastern touch to the songs by using typical instruments in his covers before he started creating his own songs.

The majority of his songs are produced by himself in the local record studios of Sabreen Association for Artistic Development. Occasionally, Murad gets grants or other support by organizations and programs such as the Culture Resource Production Awards Program that enabled him to realise the song "Shillet Hamal (Bunch of Bums)". The song is about the feeling of being different and not fitting in. The music video features several people that chose alternative paths of life and thus, can understand this feeling.

For his single "Ana Zalameh (I'm a Man)", Murad worked together with the United Nations. The UN Women's “Men and Women for Gender Equality Regional Programme” produced the song which is about the developments of gender roles in Palestine and told from the perspective of a 10 years old boy.

The collaboration with the Icelandic techno-Punk band Hatari helped Murad to reach a wider audience. The single "Klefi / Samed" was released shortly after the Eurovision Song Contest 2019, which took place in Tel Aviv, and is about the wish for freedom and calls attention to the Israeli-Palestinian conflict. Hatari was the only band that participated in that year's contest and took a stance in the conflict. In May 2021, the music video of the song reached 2 million views.

During the Eurovision Song Contest 2019, Murad was part of the protesting artists that participated in the alternative event GlobalVision that was broadcast online during the Eurovision week.

In May 2019, Murad participated in the Canadian Music Week in Toronto, Canada.

Murad released his debut EP "Maskhara" on June 11, 2021, which included four tracks: "Maskhara", "Antenne" ft. Tamer Nafar, "Intifada on the Dance Floor", and "Ana Wnafsi".

Personal life 
Murad resides in East Jerusalem with his father and younger brother.

Discography

Extended Plays 

Maskhara EP, 2021

Singles

As lead artist

 "Hallelujah", 2015
"Happy Xmas (War Is Over)" featuring Muhammad Mughrabi, 2015
"The Door", 2015
"More Like You", November 2016
"Voices", April 2017
 "Ilkul 3am Bitjawaz" (Everyone's Getting Married), January 2018
 "Shillet Hamal" (Bunch of Bums), July 2018
 "Ma Bitghayirni" (You Can't Change Me), September 2018
 "Ana Zalameh" (I'm A Man), November 2018
 "Maskhara" (Mockery), December 2020
"Antenne" Ft. Tamer Nafar, June 2021
"Intifada On The Dance Floor", November 2021

As featured artist

 "Klefi / Samed (صامد)" by Hatari, June 2019

References 

Palestinian male singers
Palestinian pop singers
Palestinian songwriters
1993 births
Living people
21st-century male singers
Palestinian LGBT people
Gay musicians
People from Jerusalem
LGBT rights activists
Palestinian women's rights activists
Arab activists
20th-century LGBT people
21st-century LGBT people